Krim Belkacem ( or ) (September 14, 1922, Aït Yahia Moussa, Tizi Ouzou Province – October 18, 1970) was the historic leader of the National Liberation Front during the Algerian War. As vice-president of the GPRA, he was the sole signatory of the Évian Accords on the Algerian side. After the 1965 coup d'état, he went into exile and was assassinated in Germany in 1970.

Biography 
Krim was born in the village of Aït Yahia Moussa (now in Tizi Ouzou Province) in the Kabylie region of Algeria. During the Second World War, he joined the French Army, and was promoted corporal in the First Algerian Sharpshooter Regiment, reputedly becoming an excellent shot. Demobilized on October 4, 1945, he returned to his home village, where he took up a bureaucratic post. Krim joined the underground Algerian People's Party at the beginning of 1946, setting up clandestine cells in 12 villages around Draa el-Mizan. Accused of the murder of a forest warden in 1947, he was hunted and he joined the maquis under the Pseudonym of Si Rabah with Moh Nachid, Mohand Talah and Messaoud Ben Arab. Twice sentenced to death by French tribunals in 1947 and 1950, he became the Kabylie responsible of the PPA-MTLD paramilitary organization founded in February 1947 by Messali Hadj, the Organisation spéciale, at the head of 22 members of the resistance (maquisards).

During the Algerian War of Independence, Krim was chief of the FLN's 3rd Wilaya, Kabylie and its surrounding area. After his important role at the Soummam Congress—in which the FLN formalized its revolutionary program—Krim became one of the most important and powerful of all the FLN chiefs. He was the first to be Minister of Defense, then Foreign Minister, in the provisional Government of the Algerian republic (GPRA) in 1958, and Vice President of Algeria. Later he was the principal Algerian negotiator of the agreements of Évian in March 1962. Belkacem was in opposition to the creation of the Political Bureau of the FLN in July 1962 by Ahmed Ben Bella, Colonel Houari Boumedienne, and Mohamed Khider.

Political views and Assassination 
After the coup d'état of June 19, 1965, he returned to the opposition. Accused of having organized an attack against Boumediene in April 1967, manipulated and betrayed by part of his entourage, he was sentenced to death in absentia. 

According to his daughter Karima, in an interview with El Moudjahid on March 25, 1998, Belkacem definitively gave up politics and went into exile in August 1967: "On August 4, 1967," she says, "he hastily packed his whole family with some effects in the family. Volkswagen and drive all night in to  Morocco. The next day, he was sentenced in absentia." On October 17, 1967, he created with friends including Slimane Amirat, Colonels Amar Ouamrane and Mohand Oulhadj, the Movement for the Defense of the Algerian Revolution (MDRA), an underground party intended to fight against the Boumediene regime.

Two years later, on October 18, 1970, he was found strangled with his tie in a room at the Inter-Continental Hotel in Frankfurt, presumably by Algerian military security agents.

See also 
 Algerian war
 List of assassinated people

References

1922 births
1970 deaths
People from Aït Yahia Moussa
Kabyle people
Algerian People's Party politicians
Movement for the Triumph of Democratic Liberties politicians
Members of the National Liberation Front (Algeria)
Assassinated Algerian politicians
People sentenced to death in absentia
French military personnel of World War II
Vice presidents of Algeria
People of the Algerian War
Algerian people murdered abroad
People murdered in Germany
Foreign ministers of Algeria
Defense ministers of Algeria
Algerian Berber politicians
20th-century Algerian politicians
Burials in Algeria